The Health and Social Care (Community Health and Standards) Act 2003 (c 43) enabled the creation of NHS Foundation Trusts. It has now mostly been replaced by the National Health Service Act 2006.

See also
UK enterprise law

United Kingdom enterprise law
United Kingdom Acts of Parliament 2003